Tony Duba is a South African politician who has served as a Member of the Eastern Cape Provincial Legislature since May 2014. He was named deputy chair of committees in May 2019. Duba is a member of the African National Congress.

Political career
Duba was elected to the Eastern Cape Provincial Legislature in May 2014. He was sworn in as a member on 21 May. During his first term, he sat on the committees on social development, oversight, and finance and provincial expenditure.

Following his re-election in May 2019, he was named deputy chair of committees. On 3 June, he received his committee assignments. Duba now sits on the committees on economic development, environmental affairs & tourism and education. He is also chair of the law review committee.

References

Living people
Year of birth missing (living people)
Xhosa people
People from the Eastern Cape
Members of the Eastern Cape Provincial Legislature
African National Congress politicians